Trichoglossum hirsutum is a species of fungus in the family Geoglossaceae. In the UK, it has been given the recommended English name of hairy earthtongue. In North America it is known variously as velvety earth tongue, shaggy earth tongue, or black earth tongue. DNA evidence suggests the hairy earthtongue may be a species complex.

Taxonomy
The species was first described by mycologist Christian Hendrik Persoon in 1794 as Geoglossum hirsutum. In 1907 Jean Louis Émile Boudier transferred the species to his new genus Trichoglossum, of which it is the type. Initial molecular research, based on cladistic analysis of DNA sequences, indicates that Trichoglossum hirsutum sensu lato comprises at least three separate taxa in Europe and North America, though these may not be morphologically distinguishable. At least one of these cryptic species occurs in both continents.

Description
Ascocarps are club-shaped, up to 90 mm (3.5 in) tall, black to dark brown, with a swollen, spore-bearing head, up to a quarter or half the ascocarp height, and a finely hirsute, cylindrical stipe (stem). Microscopically, dark, thick-walled, acute setae are present. The asci are 8-spored, the ascospores 110–160 × 5–7 μm, becoming 15-septate at maturity. 

The epithet hirsutum (Latin: 'hairy') refers to the fine hairs (setae) that cover the ascocarp.

Similar species
All Trichoglossum species appear similar in the field and can only be identified by microscopic examination. Superficially similar species of Geoglossum lack setae and are not finely hirsute under a hand lens.

Conservation
In Europe the short-spored earthtongue is typical of waxcap grasslands, a declining habitat due to changing agricultural practices.

Gallery

References

External links

Trichoglossum hirsutum at mushroomobserver.org
Trichoglossum hirsutum at California Fungi
Key to Club Fungi in the Pacific Northwest

Geoglossaceae
Fungi of North America
Fungi of Europe
Fungi described in 1794
Fungi of Macaronesia
Taxa named by Christiaan Hendrik Persoon